Light Upon Light is a studio album by American jazz trumpeter Wadada Leo Smith which was released in 1999 on the Tzadik Records' Composer Series. The album includes a composition for chamber ensemble and gamelan quartet, a solo piece for viola, a bass concerto written for Bert Turetzky and two electronic pieces.

Reception

In her review for AllMusic, Joslyn Layne states "Wadada Leo Smith's second recording for the Tzadik label, Light Upon Light, is more spacious and a little colder than his first, Tao-Njia."

Track listing
All compositions by Wadada Leo Smith.
 "Moths, Flames and the Giant Sequoia Redwood Trees" - 15:33
 "Hetep: Serenity: Tranquility 2" - 8:05
 "Multiamerica" - 10:27
 "Nur: Luminous, Light Upon Light" - 14:01
 "A Thousand Cranes: A Memorial for Amir Hamzehi" - 4:11

Personnel
Moths, Flames and the Giant Sequoia Redwood Trees
Stephen "Lucky" Mosko – conductor
Dorothy Stone – piccolo flute, alto flute
Martin Walker – clarinet, bass clarinet
Arthur Jarvinen – vibraphone, Tibetan temple bells, hi-hat cymbale-sets, axatse, large bass drum
Vicki Ray – piano
Robin Lorentz – violin
Erika Duke-Kirkpatrick – cello
I. Nyoman Wenten – gender barung
Joh Parsons – gender panembung
I. Wayhan Budha – kempul, gong ageng
Wadada Leo Smith – kenong

Hetep Serenity Tranquility 2
Karen Elaine Bakunin – viola

Multiamerica
Wadada Leo Smith – trumpet
Mark Trayle – electronics
Harumi Makino Smith – poetry

Nur Luminous, Light Upon Light
David Rosenboom – conductor
Bertram Turetzky – double bass
Dorothy Stone – piccolo, alto flute
Allen Vogel – oboe
Bill Powell – clarinet, bass clarinet
Arthur Jarvinen – marimba
Vicki Ray – celesta
Brian Pezzone – harmonium
Robin Lorentz – violin
Karen Elaine Bakunin – viola
Erika Duke-Kirkpatrick – cello

A Thousand Cranes A Memorial for Amir Hamzehi
Wadada Leo Smith – trumpet
Mark Trayle – electronics

References

1999 albums
Wadada Leo Smith albums
Tzadik Records albums